The Men's 100 metre breaststroke SB6 swimming event at the 2004 Summer Paralympics was competed on 24 September. It was won by Gareth Duke, representing .

Final round

24 Sept. 2004, evening session

References

M